The Battle of Bone Pile Creek, part of the Powder River Expedition, was fought August 13–15, 1865, by United States soldiers and civilians against Sioux and Cheyenne warriors. The battle occurred near Bone Pile Creek, in Dakota Territory, in present-day Campbell County, Wyoming.

Battle 
On August 13, 1865, the soldiers, civilians, and wagon train of Lieutenant Colonel James A. Sawyers' Expedition were moving west. The soldiers accompanying the train included twenty four men of Company B, 1st Dakota Cavalry Battalion, and about 119 men of Companies C, and D, 5th United States Volunteer Infantry under Captain George Williford, of Company C. In the evening near Gourd (also called Pumpkin) Butte, Cheyenne and Sioux warriors attacked the train, killing Nathaniel Hedges, a 19-year-old civilian employee. Later that evening, the wagons were corralled near Bone Pile Creek, and Hedges was buried in the center of the corral. The next morning, the warriors returned and attacked again. They again attacked the corralled wagons on the fifteenth, but could not overrun the wagons. Chief Red Cloud of the Sioux, chief Morning Star (Dull Knife), and George Bent of the Cheyenne, and Bull Bear negotiated with Colonel Sawyers for a safe passage of the wagon train in exchange for one wagon's load of supplies. Soldiers later reported that George Bent was dressed in a U.S. army staff officer's uniform. Sawyers agreed to give the supplies, which included a wagon full of sugar, bacon, coffee, flour, and tobacco, though Captain Williford objected to the idea. When the wagons began moving again, the Indians attacked, killing Privates Anthony Nelson, and John Rouse of Company B, 1st Dakota Cavalry. The soldiers fired back, killing two warriors, and the Native Americans quickly withdrew from the wagons.  After burying Private Nelson beside Nathaniel Hedges, and being unable to locate the body of Private Rouse, the Sawyers Expedition continued on.

The battlefield today 
The Bone Pile Creek battlefield is at an unknown location in Campbell County, Wyoming, near present-day Wright, Wyoming.

Order of battle
United States Army, Lieutenant Colonel James A. Sawyers, 196 men.

Native Americans, 500 Sioux and Cheyenne.

References 

Indian wars of the American Old West